Taishan is a town of Huojia County in northwestern Henan province, China, located around  southeast of the county seat. , it has 26 villages under its administration.

See also 
 List of township-level divisions of Henan

References 

Township-level divisions of Henan
Huojia County